David Zink (born 13 November 1991) is an Austrian football player. He plays for SC Kalsdorf in Austrian Regionalliga.

Club career
He made his Austrian Football First League debut for TSV Hartberg on 28 July 2017 in a game against Floridsdorfer AC.

References

External links
 

1991 births
Living people
Austrian footballers
TSV Hartberg players
2. Liga (Austria) players
Place of birth missing (living people)
Association football midfielders